Anthony Shields (born 4 June 1980) in Strabane, Northern Ireland is an Irish professional footballer who played as a midfielder for Finn Harps. He played for Peterborough United in the Football League.

External links

1980 births
Living people
Association football midfielders
Peterborough United F.C. players
Stevenage F.C. players
Aldershot Town F.C. players
Limavady United F.C. players
Institute F.C. players
Finn Harps F.C. players
Coleraine F.C. players
English Football League players
League of Ireland players
NIFL Premiership players
Republic of Ireland association footballers